Pachchis is a 2021 Indian Telugu-language thriller film directed by debutants Sri Krishna and Rama Sai. Produced jointly by Avasa Chitram, Raasta Films, and Mango Mass Media, the film features Raamz and Swetaa Varma in lead roles. The music of the film is composed by Smaran. It was premiered on Amazon Prime Video on 12 June 2021.

Plot 

The film opens with the interrogation of a mole/spy, Rakesh, in a gang that belongs to Gangadhar, a politician. The mole/spy reveals that he was investigating Mallikarjun, a member of the gang, before he is killed. Abhiram, a gambling addict, is in debt of a loan shark, R. K. Abhiram makes false promises to get R. K. a contract through his contact with another politician, Basava Raju. Meanwhile, Avantika, the sister of the Rakesh, takes matters into her own hands and starts searching for her brother. It is revealed that Rakesh was not a police officer, but was working for Basava Raju. After R. K. finds out the truth about Abhiram's schemes, he threatens him to repay the debt within three days. Having nowhere to escape, Abhiram triggers a game of cat and mouse to search for the mole/spy belonging to the police.

Cast 
 Raamz as Abhiram
 Swetaa Varma as Avantika
 Jay Chandra
 Ravi Varma
 Dayanand Reddy
 Keshav Deepak
 Subhalekha Sudhakar
 Vishwendar Reddy

Production 
Raamz, who previously worked as a costume designer, made his debut as an actor in the film.

Soundtrack

Reception 
Neeshita Nyayapati of The Times of India gave a rating of 2 out of 5 and stated, "Sounds great on paper, but the film fails to take off." A critic of Pinkvilla wrote about the film that "Pachchis is not a fabulous thriller but it respects the audience's time at the minimum."  LetsOTT'''s Siddarth Srinivas, rated the film 2/5 and called it a "sub-standard crime drama." He added that the film stuck to the basics when it should have really tried to do something different.

Rentala Jayadeva of Sakshi criticized the slow placed narration and stated: "" 123Telugu rated the film 2.75/5 and wrote, "On the whole, Pachchis'' is a film that has a good premise and fine taking. But it gets dull with routine scenes and lacks novelty in the latter part. The film has some good performances but the screenplay is not that effective."

References

External links 
 

2020s Telugu-language films
2021 films
Amazon Prime Video original films
Indian comedy films
Films not released in theaters due to the COVID-19 pandemic
Films set in Hyderabad, India
Films shot in Hyderabad, India
Indian action thriller films
2021 action thriller films
2021 directorial debut films